The 2006 Men's Hockey Champions Trophy was the 28th edition of the Hockey Champions Trophy, an annual international men's field hockey tournament organized by the FIH. It was held in Terrassa, Catalonia, Spain from 22–30 July 2006.

The Netherlands won the tournament after beating Germany 2–1 in the final.

Squads

Head Coach: Sergio Vigil

Head Coach: Colin Batch

Head Coach: Bernhard Peters

Head Coach: Roelant Oltmans

Head Coach: Asif Bajwa

Head Coach: Maurits Hendriks

Results
All times are Central European Summer Time (UTC+02:00)

Pool

Classification

Fifth and sixth place

Third and fourth place

Final

Awards

Final standings

See also
2006 Women's Hockey Champions Trophy

References

External links
Official FIH website

Champions Trophy
Champions Trophy (field hockey)
International field hockey competitions hosted by Catalonia
Hockey Champions Trophy Men
Sport in Terrassa
Hockey Champions Trophy Men